Hyllisia somaliensis is a species of beetle in the family Cerambycidae. It was described by Breuning in 1972.

References

somaliensis
Beetles described in 1972
Taxa named by Stephan von Breuning (entomologist)